The Coffee Airport is an under construction international airport in the town of Palestina, Caldas, Colombia. It is planned to replace La Nubia Airport, that currently serves the city of Manizales and the Colombian coffee growing axis region at large.

History 

In March 9, 2021, the National Council of Political and Social Economy ("CONPES" for its acronym in Spanish) authorized the construction of the first phase of the airport declaring it as strategically important for the nation.

Luis Carlos Velásquez Cardona, the Governor of the Department of Caldas, expects the construction of the first phase of the airport to be completed by the end of the 2023 calendar year.

Name  
Due to its location in the heart of the Colombian coffee growing axis, the airport has been christened as the Aeropuerto del Café, or AeroCafé, in homage to the production of fine coffee of the region.

Airlines and destinations 
In addition to replacing La Nubia Airport and acquiring its currently served destinations, the airport's better-suited location will allow it to serve international and trans-Atlantic destinations on wide-body aircraft.

See also  
La Nubia Airport
List of airports in Colombia

References

External links 
  Coffee Airport Official Site

Proposed airports
Airports in Colombia